Little Green Cars were an Irish indie rock band formed in Dublin in 2008. The band announced on 21 March 2019 that they were disbanding. In the wake of the band's breakup, several past members formed Soda Blonde.

History
Little Green Cars were formed in Dublin in 2008. The band members are Stevie Appleby on guitar and vocals, Faye O'Rourke on vocals, Adam O'Regan on guitar, Donagh Seaver O'Leary on Bass and Dylan Lynch on Drums. Since signing with Glassnote Music, the band has toured America and the UK extensively. The US portion of the 2013 tour included a live performance of their single Harper Lee on Late Night with Jimmy Fallon. The band has played at the 2013 SXSW music festival in Austin, Texas, the Coachella Music Festival in California, Lollapalooza 2013 in Chicago and the 2013 Osheaga festival in Montréal. On 7 January 2016 they announced their second album, Ephemera, going to be released on 11 March 2016 in BBC Radio 1 and played their first single from the album, The Song They Play Every Night. The album was named after a poem by Irish Nobel-prized poet W. B. Yeats about slowly fading love. On 10 February they uploaded the official audio of their new song, Easier Day, on their YouTube channel and the music video which was uploaded to their Vevo channel.

Early years

The band met and formed as school friends in 2008. They would rehearse in a space in Stevie Appleby's back garden and quickly began to write and record their own material. Initially the band self-released a couple of EPs which in turn caught the attention of major record labels in the UK. Their first UK release was a 7" version of The John Wayne on the Young and Lost Club label, which was produced by David Kosten and contained the b-side Glass Case. The band played many shows and rehearsals for many labels, but felt the right home for them was New York based label Glassnote. Daniel Glass made several trips to Ireland to meet with the band and they signed with the label in January 2012. The band were named on the prestigious BBC sound poll for 2013, along with Haim, Savages and Chvrches.

Discography

Studio albums

EPs

Singles

References

External links
 

Irish alternative rock groups
Irish indie rock groups
Musical groups established in 2008
Musical groups disestablished in 2019
Musical groups from Dublin (city)
Glassnote Records artists